Frank Phillips (November 28, 1873 – August 23, 1950) was the founder of Phillips Petroleum in Bartlesville, Oklahoma (marketed as Phillips 66) in 1917, along with his brother, Lee Eldas "L.E." Phillips Sr. In 2002, Phillips Petroleum merged with Conoco Oil Company and became ConocoPhillips.

Early life and education 
Frank Phillips was born on November 28, 1873, in Scotia, Nebraska where his parents Lucinda and Lewis Franklin Phillips, the county's first magistrate, had a farm; the family moved in 1874 to a small farm in rural southwest Iowa. Frank had ten siblings, including two brothers with whom he later went into business. One notable family member is his sibling Waite Phillips, who founded the Philmont Scout Ranch in New Mexico, a destination for thousands of Boy Scouts to backpack the mountains.

A few years later, the Phillips boy began his first occupational endeavor, hiring himself out to area farmers to dig potatoes for 10 cents a day (after completing his chores at home). At age 14, Phillips persuaded a barber in nearby Creston, Iowa, to take him on as an apprentice. Ten years later, Phillips owned all three barber shops in Creston. One of his barbershops was in the basement of a bank in Creston.

Marriage and family
On February 18, 1898, Phillips married Jane Gibson, daughter of the bank president John Gibby, in Creston. They had one son, John Gibson Phillips. Later they adopted two daughters, orphaned sisters whom they named Mary Francis and Sara Jane Phillips, where shortly after his wife unfortunately passed away.

Career
The bank's president, John Gibson, had considered Phillips an up-and-coming entrepreneur for some time. Shortly after Phillips married Jane Gibson, her father asked Phillips to join him in the bond business. Phillips began selling bonds in the New England states and the Chicago area.

During a stop in St. Louis en route back to Creston from Chicago in 1903, Phillips encountered C. B. Larabee, an old friend from Iowa. He was serving as a Methodist missionary to the Osage Indians west of Bartlesville in Indian Territory. The area, which is now Osage County, Oklahoma, was rich in oil, and what proved to be a decades-long boom was just getting underway. Later that year, after Phillips and Gibson made two trips to Bartlesville, Phillips and his younger brother L. E. Phillips organized the Anchor Oil & Gas Company with Gibson's assistance.

Anchor opened an office in Bartlesville in 1905, secured a driller and drilled its first wildcat well, the Holland No. 1. The men struck oil on June 23, 1905. The brothers' second and third wells were dry holes, and they had barely enough money left to drill a fourth well, the Anna Anderson Number One. The Anna Anderson, completed September 6, 1905, was a gusher, and the successful well enabled the brothers to raise $100,000 through the sale of stock. The Anna Anderson was the first of 80 consecutive producing wells drilled for the brothers' company.

Also in 1905, Frank and L. E. Phillips formed the Lewcinda Oil Company, with brother Waite. Waite, who preferred to work independently, soon left Lewcinda and formed his own bank and oil company, the Independent Oil & Gas Co. in Tulsa. In 1930 he merged it with Phillips Petroleum.

In late 1905, Frank and L.E. formed a bank, Citizens Bank and Trust, in Bartlesville with $50,000 capital. They also acquired a rival bank, the Bartlesville National Bank, and consolidating the two under the latter name. The bank later became the First National Bank of Bartlesville. Phillips still wanted to be a big-time banker. In 1916, he and L.E. decided that the boom-bust instability of the oil business was not for them. They made plans to open a bank in Kansas City that would be the cornerstone of a chain of banks throughout the Midwest. Before those plans could be carried out, the U.S. became involved in World War I.

With the price of oil quickly increasing from 40 cents a barrel to more than $1 a barrel, the brothers decided to consolidate their holdings in a single company, Phillips Petroleum Company. They incorporated on June 13, 1917, under Delaware law. The new company had assets of $3 million, 27 employees and leases throughout Oklahoma and Kansas.

Phillips once said to employees, to whom he was known as "Uncle Frank": "Work hard and demonstrate loyalty, and I'm a great guy to work for. Do neither, and there is no one worse." On another occasion, he said, "I am egotistical. I exercise the 'privilege and prestige of the office.' I'm bombastic, hard to get along with, an easy touch, a farm boy at heart, and conveniently hard of hearing. I'm just a sentimental old man. I'm tough. and I know it. I'm the boss, and don't let anybody try to question it."

Frank Phillips led the company as its president until age 65, when in 1939 he named Kenneth S. "Boots" Adams to succeed him. The company had reported record profits of $24.1 million the previous year. As Phillips turned over the presidency to Adams, he became the company's first chairman of the board, a position he held until he retired at the age of 76 in 1949, a year before his death. Jane Phillips, his wife of 50 years, died in 1948. He died while on a vacation in Atlantic City, New Jersey on August 23, 1950. He was buried beside his wife in the Phillips Family Mausoleum at Woolaroc, Phillips' ranch and country home in Osage County, Oklahoma, southwest of Bartlesville.

Legacy and honors
In 1944, Phillips had given  acres of the  ranch to the Frank Phillips Foundation and sold the remainder.
Frank Phillips College, a community junior college in Borger, Texas, was named after him.
Frank Phillips was inducted into the Oklahoma Hall of Fame in 1930.
In 2008 the former home of Frank and Jane Phillips was added to Oklahoma's National Register of Historic Places

Notes and references

External links

 
 Voices of Oklahoma interview with Elliot "Chope" Phillips. First person interview conducted on May 5, 2009, with Elliot "Chope" Phillips, nephew of Frank Phillips. Original audio and transcript archived with Voices of Oklahoma oral history project.

American businesspeople in the oil industry
Businesspeople from Oklahoma
Petroleum in Oklahoma
1873 births
1950 deaths
People from Bartlesville, Oklahoma
People from Creston, Iowa
Philanthropists from Oklahoma